The 1921 Kansas State Wildcats football team represented Kansas State Agricultural College in the 1921 college football season.

Schedule

References

Kansas State
Kansas State Wildcats football seasons
Kansas State Wildcats football